Kobbegem is a village that is now part of the municipality of Asse, Flemish Brabant, Belgium.

It was an independent agricultural municipality until 1976. In 1997 it had 805 inhabitants and a brewery.

Populated places in Flemish Brabant